Hollywood: A Story of a Dozen Roses (also commonly known as Hollywood) is the fifth and most recent studio album by American R&B singer and actor Jamie Foxx. It was released on May 15, 2015, by RCA Records. The album includes musical appearances from Chris Brown, Fabolous, Kid Ink, Pharrell Williams and Wale, while production on the album was handled by Boi-1da, DJ Mustard, Mario Winans and Vinylz, among others.

The album debuted at number ten on the US Billboard 200 chart, selling 31,000 copies in its first week.

Background and concept
 Hollywood: A Story of a Dozen Roses as Foxx describes the album, as a focus on a former relationship, he had in Hollywood, California, where his girlfriend abandons him in his time of need. stating:

Singles 
The album's lead single, titled "Ain't My Fault", was released on November 25, 2014. The song was written and produced by Mario Winans.

The album's second single, "You Changed Me" featuring Chris Brown, was released on March 12, 2015. The production on the song was handled by Boi-1da, Vinylz, Allen Ritter, Kevin Cossom and Jordan Evans. The song has so far peaked at number 93 on the US Billboard Hot 100.

The album's third single, "Baby's In Love" featuring Kid Ink, was released on May 4, 2015. The production on the song was handled by Cook Classics.

Foxx announced "In Love By Now" as the album's fourth single August 26, 2015.

Promotional singles
"Party Ain't a Party" featuring 2 Chainz, was released on October 7, 2014. and features production from DJ Mustard.

"Pretty Thing" (originally titled "Pretty Young Thing") premiered on March 11, 2015, was produced by DJ Mustard, and sampled Michael Jackson's hit single "P.Y.T. (Pretty Young Thing)".

Critical reception 

Hollywood: A Story of a Dozen Roses received generally mixed reviews from music critics. At Metacritic, which assigns a normalized rating out of 100, to reviews from mainstream publications, the album received an average score of 53 based on 5 reviews, signifying "mixed or average reviews". Hillary Crosley of Billboard  described the album as a "disjointed outing", saying that "It sounds like a collection of random one-offs rather than an album. Foxx's voice, falsetto and all, still sounds lovely, but he seems unsure exactly how he should use it." Andy Kellman of AllMusic was critical of the album, saying "That material, as well as much of what surrounds it, is significantly less substantive than the singer's past work" stating that the single "You Changed Me" is "the only adult cut off the album".

Commercial performance 
Hollywood: A Story of a Dozen Roses debuted at number ten on the US Billboard 200 chart, selling 31,000 copies in its first week. This became Foxx's fourth consecutive US top-ten album. The album debuted at number one on the US Top R&B/Hip-Hop Albums, scoring Foxx's third chart-topper and first since 2009. In its second week, the album dropped to number 32 on the chart, selling an additional 11,000 copies, bringing its two-week total to 42,000 copies.

Track listing

Charts

Weekly charts

Year-end charts

Release history

See also 
 List of Billboard number-one R&B/Hip-Hop albums of 2015

References 

2015 albums
Jamie Foxx albums
RCA Records albums
Albums produced by Vinylz
Albums produced by Boi-1da
Albums produced by Frank Dukes
Albums produced by DJ Mustard
Albums produced by Pharrell Williams
Albums produced by Allen Ritter